Seed of Evil (original name Nie Zhong) is a 1981 Hong Kong comedic thriller written and directed by actress turned director Kao Pao-shu. It's notable for being her last directorial effort. Actors Yasuaki Kurata, Tamaki Funakura, and Shirley Yu star. The film—which centers on two young sisters who are constantly fighting—has a slapstick sensibility to its comedy. It never got a U.S. release.

References

1981 films
1980s comedy thriller films
Hong Kong comedy thriller films
1980s Hong Kong films